"If I Was You (OMG)" is a song by Asian-American hip hop group Far East Movement. The song features rapper Snoop Dogg and was produced by the Stereotypes and The Smeezingtons. The original recording appears on the album Free Wired with a total run time of 3:25. It peaked at number 18 on the New Zealand Singles Chart. An official remix was made by Far East Movement and Snoop Dogg called "On Campus Remix".

Music video
The music video for the song premiered on Vevo and YouTube on March 16, 2011.
You can also see Natalia Kills, and Dominican model Rosa Acosta as Snoop Dogg's love interest.

Track listing
If I Was You (OMG) EP
"If I Was You (OMG)" (Club Remix] (feat. Snoop Dogg) - 3:28
"So What?" (Reflip Live at the Cherrytree House) - 4:37
"Don’t Look Now" (Fantastadon Remix) (feat. Keri Hilson) - 4:03

Credits and personnel
 Lead vocals – Far East Movement & Snoop Dogg
Producers – Stereotypes, The Smeezingtons
Lyrics – Bruno Mars, Calvin Broadus, Jonathan Yip, Jeremy Reeves, Ray Romulus, James Roh, Kevin Nishimura, Virman Coquia, Jae Choung
Label: Interscope Records

Charts

References 

2011 singles
Far East Movement songs
Snoop Dogg songs
Songs written by Snoop Dogg
Songs written by Bruno Mars
Song recordings produced by the Smeezingtons
Song recordings produced by the Stereotypes
Songs written by Jonathan Yip
Songs written by Ray Romulus
Songs written by Jeremy Reeves
2010 songs